Bridget Maeve Phillipson (born 19 December 1983) is a British politician serving as Shadow Secretary of State for Education since 2021. A member of the Labour Party, she has been Member of Parliament  for Houghton and Sunderland South since 2010. She served as Shadow Chief Secretary to the Treasury from 2020 to 2021.

Early life 
Bridget Maeve Phillipson was born on 19 December 1983 in Gateshead, Tyne and Wear. She is the daughter of Clare Phillipson, who founded Wearside Women in Need in 1983 as a charity refuge for women affected by domestic violence. She was educated at St Robert of Newminster Catholic School in Washington, Tyne and Wear. From there, she went on to study Modern History at Hertford College, Oxford, graduating in 2005.

She joined the Labour Party at the age of fifteen. In 2003, she was elected Co-Chair of the Oxford University Labour Club. Between 2007 and 2010, she was a manager at Wearside Women in Need, a charity founded by her mother.

Political career
Phillipson was selected from an all-women shortlist as the Labour candidate for Houghton and Sunderland South in 2009 and elected as an MP at the 2010 general election. Phillipson was the first MP to be declared to be elected to the 2010 and 2015 parliaments. After entering parliament, she was appointed Parliamentary Private Secretary to Jim Murphy, who was then the shadow defence secretary. Between October 2013 and September 2015, she served as Opposition Whip in the House of Commons.

She was elected to the Home Affairs Committee in July 2010, and remained a member until November 2013. She was a member of the Public Bill Committee for the Defence Reform Act 2014, and of the Procedure Committee between July 2010 and October 2011. She has also been a member of the Speaker's Committee on the Electoral Commission since October 2010, and both the Committee on Standards and the Committee on Privileges since October 2017. She is currently also a member of the Public Accounts Committee and the European Statutory Instruments Committee. From 2010 to 2015, she was secretary to the All-Party Parliamentary Group (APPG) on Domestic and Sexual Violence, which published the report "The Changing Landscape of Domestic and Sexual Violence Services" in February 2015.

Despite being an opposition MP since entering Parliament in 2010, she has campaigned successfully on a number of local issues, including forcing a government U-turn on the rebuilding of Hetton School, after plans to do so were cancelled by the Conservative-led government in 2010. The school was eventually rebuilt and reopened in 2016. She also led a campaign to improve standards and affordability of bus transport in Tyne and Wear, calling for the development of a quality contract scheme to be run by Nexus, the passenger transport executive for the North East Combined Authority. The government-appointed review board eventually refused permission for Nexus to advance the scheme.

In the 2016 European referendum, she campaigned for a Remain vote, and in 2018 was one of the first Labour MPs to call for a People's Vote on any eventual deal.

Within the Labour Party, she voted for David Miliband as leader in 2010, Yvette Cooper in 2015, Owen Smith in 2016, and Keir Starmer in 2020.

Following Starmer's leadership election victory in April 2020, Phillipson was appointed to the shadow cabinet for the first time, as Shadow Chief Secretary to the Treasury. On 29 November 2021 she was moved to the role of shadow secretary of state for education.

In October 2022, Phillipson criticised Suella Braverman's reappointment as Home Secretary. Phillipson stated: "One moment Rishi Sunak is telling us he will lead a government of integrity, and then another minute he's appointing someone back into the cabinet who'd been sacked only the week before for a serious breach of security and a potential breach of the ministerial code."

Personal life
Phillipson is married with two children. She met her husband Lawrence after leaving university, in Newcastle. She is a Roman Catholic.

References

External links
 
 
 

Labour Party (UK) MPs for English constituencies
Living people
1983 births
Alumni of Hertford College, Oxford
British Roman Catholics
People from Gateshead
Politicians from Tyne and Wear
Female members of the Parliament of the United Kingdom for English constituencies
Labour Friends of Israel
21st-century British women politicians
UK MPs 2010–2015
UK MPs 2015–2017
UK MPs 2017–2019
UK MPs 2019–present
21st-century English women
21st-century English people